Peter Lehmann may refer to:

Peter Lehmann (winemaker) (1930–2013), Australian winemaker
Peter Lehmann (author) (born 1950), German author
Peter Lehmann (ice hockey) (born 1946), Swiss ice hockey player

See also
Lehmann